Park Royal is a station on the Piccadilly line of the London Underground. It is situated on the south side of the east–west Western Avenue (A40), surrounded by residential Ealing and industrial Park Royal. There is a pedestrian subway under the A40 road near the station.

The station's platforms have a continuous significant gradient (sloping up from south to north).

History

A station, Park Royal & Twyford Abbey, was opened at that time a short distance to the north of the current station to serve the Royal Agricultural Society's recently opened Park Royal show grounds.

It opened on 6 July 1931 and replaced the earlier station which closed on the previous day.

First opened as a temporary timber structure, the current station building was designed by Welch & Lander in an Art Deco/Streamline Moderne style influenced by the Underground's principal architect Charles Holden. The station buildings are formed from a series of simple interconnecting geometric shapes. Plain red brick masses are accented with strong horizontal and vertical glazed elements. A large circular ticket hall with high level windows gives access to the platform stairs. The enclosures for these form cascades of glazed steps down to the platforms.

The most prominent feature of the station building is the tall square tower adjacent to the ticket hall. This is adorned with the Underground roundel; and represents a visible locator for the station from some distance. The permanent structure was opened in 1936. Attached to the station building and across the small open space of Hanger Green are two curved three-storey retail and office buildings built in the same style as the station.

From Ealing Common to South Harrow, the District line was replaced by the Piccadilly line.

From 1 March 1936 until 1947 the station name was modified to Park Royal (Hanger Hill). The suffix was then dropped and the station returned to the unmodified version. Hanger Hill referred to a residential estate adjacent to the station.

Possible development
The Mayor's plans for the area include improvements to the station access. In 2018, it was announced that the station would gain step free access by 2022, as part of a £200m investment to increase the number of accessible stations on the Tube.

The developers of the First Central business park at Park Royal were planning a new station between North Acton and Hanger Lane on the Central line. This would have served the business park and provide a walking distance interchange with Park Royal station. This is not being actively pursued. London Underground has said that the transport benefits of a Park Royal station on the Central line are not sufficiently high to justify the costs of construction.

Services
The off-peak service in trains per hour (tph) is:
6tph to Cockfosters (Eastbound)
3tph to Rayners Lane (Westbound)
3tph to Uxbridge via Rayners Lane (Westbound)

The peak time service in trains per hour (tph) is:
12tph to Cockfosters (Eastbound)
6tph to Rayners Lane (Westbound)
6tph to Uxbridge via Rayners Lane (Westbound)

Connections
London Buses routes 95 and 487 serve the station.

Gallery

References

External links

 London Transport Museum Photographic Archive 

 A new footpath would have passed under the road on the right, to reach the proposed Central line platforms (which are unlikely to be built)

First Central Business Park

Tube stations in the London Borough of Ealing
Former Metropolitan District Railway stations
Railway stations in Great Britain opened in 1931
Piccadilly line stations
Tube station
Streamline Moderne architecture in the United Kingdom
Art Deco architecture in London
Art Deco railway stations
Grade II listed buildings in the London Borough of Ealing